The Dalabon or Dangbon are an Australian Aboriginal people of the Northern Territory.

Name
Traditionally the people now called Dalabon had no collective name for themselves, and the term itself derives from the language which members of the community speak.

Language
The Dalabon language is classified among the far East Arnhem Land language group, and as belonging to the Gunwinyguan language family. It is under severe threat of extinction. One feature of its linguistic culture, the relative absence of nouns for emotions, combined with its rich repertoire (160 lexemes) of emotional verbs and adjectives.

Country
The anthropologist, Norman Tindale, placed their northern boundary at the upper Goyder River, and their heartland around the headwaters of the Phelp, Rose and Hart rivers. Linguistics scholar, Maïa Ponsonnet, states that, before the colonial period, the Dalbon people were located in Central Arnhem Land, with clan estates extending further north in the direction of the Arafura Sea.

Their immediate tribal environment consisted of several peoples: the Jawoyn to their southwest, Kune and Mayali speakers of the Bininj Kunwok dialect chain on their west-north western boundaries, the Ngalakgan on their southern frontier, and the Rembarrnga beyond their eastern limits.

Lifestyle
The Dalabon were semi-nomadic hunter gatherers, with access to abundant food resources culled throughout a mixed savannah and forest area which experienced three seasonal changes: a humid wet monsoonal period from December to April, followed by three cool dry months (May to July), and closing with the gradual onset of warming from August to November as a prelude to the return of the rainy summer season.

Social organization
Dalabon society had 8 subsections, each of which had a male and female name, and which can be analysed in terms of three dichotomies.  The first taxonomy identifies people in terms of patrimoieties of the Dua/Yirritja type. A second division of descent is matrilineal; the intersection of these two forms 4 sections. A third system has subsections to elicit the ideal father-and-son pairs.

The structure of these moieties and semi-moieties affects the ritual choreography of two major ceremonies, Gunabibi and Yabuduruwa, held on alternating years by the Dalabon and some contiguous tribes.

Mythology
In the earliest times, according to Dalabon cosmology, men passed the night-time under water, and had stumps for legs. The crocodile was master of the secret of fire. This changed when the kingfisher managed to filch a firebrand from the crocodile, and set fire to the landscape, and men were burnt, leading them to learn the art of cooking and also acquire the legs they now have. Two pairs of immemorial, ancestral people (Nayunghyungkig), the Yirritja men Bulanj and Kodjok, and the Duwa women Kalidjan and Kamanj, -collectively referred to as the Nakoorkko - wandered the earth, laying down the law (walu-no) inscribed in the nature of the Dalabon landscape and its reflex in Dalabon social customs.

Modern times
The Dalabon today mainly live in an area east of Katherine, in Wugularr (formerly Beswick), Barunga (formerly Bamyili), Bulman and Weemol.

Customs
Kenneth Maddock found the Dalabon still preserved a custom, which they called magard, which had been briefly noted earlier among the Yolngu and the Burarra, and called Mirriri, according to which a man whose classificatory sister had been subject to obscene abuse implying she was engaged in sexual improprieties, was obliged to assault her, armed with a spear, boomerang or sticks. W. Lloyd Warner took the practice as a ritual expression of displeasure performed to allay the outbreak of hostilities between the respective clans of husband and wife; Lester Hiatt thought his material suggested rather a brother's disavowal of incestuous interest in his sister; Maddock took the Dalabon custom as a predictable ceremonial affirmation of a social relation forming part of a larger body of tribal etiquette.

Ethnographic studies
Kenneth Maddock did the first comprehensive studies of the Dalabon.

Alternative names
 Buan, Bu:wan, Boun
 Ngalkbon

Tindale's Dangbon
Norman Tindale posited the existence of a 'tribe', the Dangbon whom he considered distinct from the Dalabon, but was unable to furnish an estimate for their tribal lands, other than locating these Dangbon to the east of the Liverpool River's headwaters and at those of the Cadell and Mann rivers. He also provided a list of alternative names for this group:
 Gundangbon
 Dangbun
 Dangbar. (typo)
 Gumauwurk

Contemporary scholarship now regards Dangbon as an alternative name for the Dalabon.

Some words
Nicholas Evans notes that the Dalabon root √men, with more or less the general sense of 'social conscience /awareness', emerges in an adjectival compound form like men-djabalarrk (obedient) that is applied also to non-human beings like a dog.

Notes

Citations

Sources

Aboriginal peoples of the Northern Territory
Arnhem Land